Zainul Abidin bin Mohamed Rasheed (born 17 March 1948) is a Singaporean diplomat, former politician and journalist. A former member of the governing People's Action Party (PAP), he was the Member of Parliament (MP) representing Eunos ward of Aljunied GRC between 2001 and 2011 and Cheng San GRC representing Punggol East ward from 1997 to 2001. 

He previously served as Senior Minister of State for Foreign Affairs between 2006 and 2011 and the Mayor of North East District from 2001 to 2009. He has been serving as Singapore Ambassador to the State of Kuwait and Special Envoy to the Middle East.

Education
Zainul attended Jalan Daud Primary School and Raffles Institution before graduating from the National University of Singapore where he majored in economics. He was also awarded the Gold Outstanding Young Singaporean Award in 1974.

Career

Journalistic career 
Zainul Abidin was a journalist with Singapore Press Holdings between 1976 and 1996, working as an editor for the Asia News Bulletin, Berita Harian and The Sunday Times, and then Associate Editor of The Straits Times, before being seconded to the government sector.

Political career 
Zainul Abidin first stood for the 1997 Singapore general elections under the People's Action Party (PAP) under Cheng San Group Representation Constituency (GRC), against the Workers' Party (WP), whose notable candidates were J. B. Jeyaratnam and Tang Liang Hong. The PAP won that constituency.

Zainul Abidin was appointed Senior Parliamentary Secretary for the Ministry of Foreign Affairs from 1998 – 2001. 

Zainul Abidin later moved to Aljunied GRC for the 2001 general elections where there is a walkover. He was then appointed Minister of State for the Ministry of Foreign Affairs in 2004. 

He remained in Aljunied GRC for the 2006 general elections where the WP also contested in the ward. The PAP team won the elections with 56.09% of the votes. He was subsequently given a Senior Minister of State role in 2006 to 2011.

He also held the post of Mayor of the Northeast Community Development Council from 2001 to 2008.

In the 2011 general elections, Zainul Abidin was part of the PAP team which lost Aljunied GRC to the WP. In a post-election interview, he suggested that Lee Kuan Yew's remarks on Malays, Muslims and integration in his book, Hard Truths to Keep Singapore Going, may have had some influence over the Malay votes, and "many were hurt by those remarks and remain so."

Corporate and public service appointments 
Zainul Abidin was a member of the  Majlis Ugama Islam Singapura (MUIS) from 1986 to 1988. He then served in Mendaki from 1990 to 1993.

He has held various appointments, among them being:
 Member of the National University of Singapore Council,
 Member of the board of trustees, NTUC Healthcare Co-operative Ltd
 Member of the Board of directors of Mendaki Holdings
 Member of the RI Board of Governors
 Advisor of the Singapore Port Workers Union
 Ex-deputy Chairman of the Malay Heritage Foundation
 Member of the National Medical Ethics Committee

In September 2011, after the general elections, Zainul Abidin was appointed as the chairman SPH UnionWorks, owned by the Singapore Press Holdings, which operates two Singapore radio stations 91.3FM and 100.3FM. He was also named as the consultant of the book publishing arm SPH's book publishing arm, Straits Times Press (STP). 

Zainul Abidin also serves on the boards of various local and international companies including Chairman of Diamond Energy Corporation, deputy chairman, lead independent director of Australian-listed OM Holdings, Director of Mediacorp, Board Member of National Volunteer Philanthropy Centre and Director of Temasek Cares. He also serves as a corporate adviser to Temasek International.

Diplomatic career 
On 27 October 2011, Zainul Abidin was appointed non-resident Ambassador to Kuwait and a special envoy of the Minister for Foreign Affairs to the Middle East.

Personal life
Zainul Abidin is married and has 3 sons and a daughter.

References

|-

1948 births
Living people
Singaporean people of Malay descent
Singaporean Muslims
People's Action Party politicians
Members of the Parliament of Singapore
Raffles Institution alumni
National University of Singapore alumni